Jill Gray Savarase (born 1969) is an American actress best known for her role of "Faith" in the cult film Metamorphosis: Beyond the Screen Door, the first American feature film adaptation of Franz Kafka's short story The Metamorphosis.

Savarese grew up in Pickerington, Ohio. After a career as an actress and fortune teller, she attended Yale University through a program for non-traditional students and completed her bachelor's degree in linguistics in 2003. She founded a business designing and selling women's handbags, which she sold in 2004.  Additionally, she opened up an agency for American Sign Language interpreters. In this capacity, she interpreted for such notable people as Bill Clinton, Tony Blair, and Sonia Sotomayor. She is vice president of a film distribution company.

External links

References

1969 births
American actresses
Living people
People from Pickerington, Ohio
21st-century American women